The Old Tree is a plaster sculpture by the French artist Auguste Rodin, originally conceived as part of his The Gates of Hell project.

Work
Rodin produced it in 1885, only a year after the formation of the Salon des Independents. It measures  and shows a nude young woman clinging to an old man holding his arms out like a tree, contrasting several opposites - male and female, youth and age, softness and roughness. 

The work was cast from the plaster original by Georges Rudier's studio in black and green patina bronze. The bronze was exhibited in 1900 in the Pavilion de l'Alma and the La Plume salon - in La Revue Blanche, Felicien Fagus wrote:

See also
List of sculptures by Auguste Rodin

References

External links

Sculptures by Auguste Rodin
1885 sculptures
Sculptures of the Museo Soumaya
Plaster sculptures
Bronze sculptures